Chimbu River is a river in the Chimbu Province of Papua New Guinea. The Chimbu is a tributary of the Tua.

References

Rivers of Papua New Guinea
Chimbu Province